Splendrillia boucheti is a species of sea snail, a marine gastropod mollusk in the family Drilliidae.

Description

Distribution
This marine species occurs off New Caledonia.

References

 Wells, Fred E. "A revision of the drilliid genera Splendrillia and Plagiostropha (Gastropoda: Conoidea) from New Caledonia, with additional records from other areas." Mémoires du Muséum national d'histoire naturelle 167 (1995): 527–556.

External links
  Tucker, J.K. 2004 Catalog of recent and fossil turrids (Mollusca: Gastropoda). Zootaxa 682:1-1295.
 Holotype in MNHN, Paris

boucheti
Gastropods described in 1995